The 23rd César Awards ceremony, presented by the Académie des Arts et Techniques du Cinéma, honoured the best French films of 1997 and took place on 28 February 1998 at the Théâtre des Champs-Élysées in Paris. The ceremony was chaired by Juliette Binoche and hosted by Antoine de Caunes. Same Old Song won the award for Best Film.

Winners and nominees
The winners are highlighted in bold:

See also
 70th Academy Awards
 51st British Academy Film Awards
 10th European Film Awards
 3rd Lumières Awards

External links

 Official website
 
 23rd César Awards at AlloCiné

1998
1998 film awards
1998 in France